The white-collared fruit bat (Megaerops wetmorei) is a species of megabat found in Southeast Asia.

References

Megaerops
Bats of Southeast Asia
Bats of Indonesia
Bats of Malaysia
Mammals of Borneo
Mammals of Brunei
Mammals of the Philippines
Least concern biota of Asia
Mammals described in 1934